Tony Hutson (born March 13, 1974) is a former American football offensive lineman in the National Football League for the Dallas Cowboys and Washington Redskins. He played college football at Kilgore College Kilgore College (1992-93) and Northeastern Oklahoma State University.

Early years
Hutson attended MacArthur High School, where he played as an offensive tackle, receiving All-state, All-Greater Houston and All-district honors as a senior. He moved on to Kilgore College, where he was a two-time All-conference selection.

He transferred to Northeastern Oklahoma State University, where he received NAIA All-American honors while playing as an offensive tackle.

In 1999, he was voted as part of the state of Oklahoma college football All-Century team.

Professional career

Dallas Cowboys
Hutson was signed as an undrafted free agent by the Dallas Cowboys after the 1996 NFL Draft. He dropped because of a benign tumor that was found in his right lung, that could have potentially shortened his career. As a rookie, he was converted into an offensive guard. He was waived on August 26 and later signed to the practice squad. On January 5, 1997, he was promoted to the active roster for the Divisional playoff game against the Carolina Panthers, although he was declared inactive.

In 1997, he suffered a ligament injury in his right wrist during offseason workouts, that limited him to only playing in the final 2 preseason games. On August 24, he was released and signed to the practice squad two days later. On November 4, he was promoted to the active roster for the last five games of the season.

In 1998, he was deactivated for the first 5 games of the season. He was also used as a second tight end on short yardage situations.

In 1999, he was limited by a sprained medial collateral ligament in his right knee. He returned to practice on August 18 and played only in the final 2 preseason games. He got a chance to start 2 games at right tackle in place of an injured Erik Williams. He suffered a torn right anterior cruciate ligament in the third game against the Arizona Cardinals and was placed on the injured reserve list on October 5.

On August 27, 2000, he was cut after being passed on the depth chart by undrafted free agent Alcender Jackson.

Washington Redskins
On October 9, 2000, he was signed as a free agent with the Washington Redskins, who were looking to replace an injured Tre' Johnson. He wasn't re-signed at the end of the season.

Oakland Raiders
In 2001, he was signed by the Oakland Raiders as a free agent. He was released before the start of the season, after he struggled with a triceps injury.

References

1974 births
Living people
Players of American football from Houston
American football offensive guards
Kilgore Rangers football players
Northeastern State RiverHawks football players
Dallas Cowboys players
Washington Redskins players
MacArthur High School (Harris County, Texas) alumni